The Annie Award for Best Animated Television Production for Preschool is an Annie Award, awarded annually to the best animated television/broadcasting productions for preschool audiences.

Winners and nominees

2010s

2020s

See also
 Daytime Emmy Award for Outstanding Pre-School Children's Animated Program

References

External links
 Annie Awards: Legacy

Annie Awards
American television awards